Mogrus is a genus of jumping spiders that was first described by Eugène Louis Simon in 1882.

Species
 it contains twenty-nine species, found only in Asia, Europe, and Africa:
Mogrus albogularis Simon, 1901 – South Africa
Mogrus antoninus Andreeva, 1976 – Russia (Europe to Central Asia), Kazakhstan, Iran, Central Asia to China
Mogrus bonneti (Audouin, 1826) – Egypt to Yemen
Mogrus canescens (C. L. Koch, 1846) – Eastern Mediterranean
Mogrus cognatus Wesolowska & van Harten, 1994 – Yemen, United Arab Emirates
Mogrus dalmasi Berland & Millot, 1941 – Mali
Mogrus fabrei Simon, 1885 – Middle East
Mogrus faizabadicus Andreeva, Kononenko & Prószyński, 1981 – Afghanistan
Mogrus flavescentemaculatus (Lucas, 1846) – Algeria
Mogrus frontosus (Simon, 1871) – France (Corsica), Sri Lanka
Mogrus fulvovittatus Simon, 1882 (type) – Egypt, Saudi Arabia, Yemen, Azerbaijan
Mogrus ignarus Wesolowska, 2000 – Zimbabwe
Mogrus incertus Denis, 1955 – Libya, Niger
Mogrus larisae Logunov, 1995 – Ukraine, Kazakhstan, Uzbekistan, Turkmenistan, Kyrgyzstan
Mogrus leucochelis Pavesi, 1897 – Somalia
Mogrus linzhiensis Hu, 2001 – China
Mogrus logunovi Prószyński, 2000 – Egypt, Israel, Jordan, Yemen, United Arab Emirates
Mogrus macrocephalus Lawrence, 1927 – Namibia
Mogrus mathisi (Berland & Millot, 1941) – Africa, Saudi Arabia, Yemen
Mogrus mirabilis Wesolowska & van Harten, 1994 – Sudan, Egypt, Yemen, Saudi Arabia, Jordan, Iraq
Mogrus neglectus (Simon, 1868) – Greece, Macedonia, Turkey, Cyprus, Israel, Caucasus (Russia, Azerbaijan), Iran, Kazakhstan
Mogrus portentosus Wesolowska & van Harten, 1994 – Yemen
Mogrus praecinctus Simon, 1890 – Yemen
Mogrus rajasthanensis Caleb, Chatterjee, Tyagi, Kundu & Kumar, 2017 – India
Mogrus sahariensis Berland & Millot, 1941 – West Africa
Mogrus semicanus Simon, 1910 – Namibia
Mogrus sinaicus Prószyński, 2000 – Egypt, Saudi Arabia
Mogrus valerii Kononenko, 1981 – Turkmenistan, Uzbekistan
Mogrus woodi (Peckham & Peckham, 1902) – Zimbabwe

References

Salticidae genera
Arthropods of the Middle East
Salticidae
Spiders of Africa
Spiders of Asia